The 2005 Men's EuroHockey Nations Challenge II was the first edition of the EuroHockey Nations Challenge II, the fourth level of the men's European field hockey championships organized by the European Hockey Federation. It was held from 5 to 10 September 2005 in Kordin, Paola, Malta.

Denmark won the first edition of the EuroHockey Nations Challenge II and were promoted to the EuroHockey Nations Challenge I together with Azerbaijan.

Results
All times are local, CEST (UTC+1).

Preliminary round

First to fourth place classification

Semi-finals

Third place game

Final

Final standings

 Promoted to the EuroHockey Nations Challenge I

See also
2005 Men's EuroHockey Nations Challenge I

References

EuroHockey Championship IV
Men 4
EuroHockey Nations Challenge II
EuroHockey Nations Challenge II
International field hockey competitions hosted by Malta
Paola, Malta